Contao Airport ,  is an airport serving Contao, a village in the Los Lagos Region of Chile.

The village is on the shore of the Reloncaví Sound, and approach and departures are along the shoreline. There is mountainous terrain east of the runway.

See also

Transport in Chile
List of airports in Chile

References

External links
OpenStreetMap - Contao
OurAirports - Contao
FallingRain - Contao Airport

Airports in Los Lagos Region
Coasts of Los Lagos Region